Javier Ernesto Chirinos Ramírez (born 8 May 1960) is a retired Peruvian footballer and currently the manager of Cobresol in the Torneo Descentralizado. During his playing career as a midfielder, he most notably played for Atlético Chalaco and Universitario de Deportes.

Playing career

Club
Chirinos made his Torneo Descentralizado debut in the 1978 season playing for Atlético Chalaco

In January 1983 Chirinos moved to Peruvian giants Universitario de Deportes.

International
While playing for Universitario, Chirinos made his debut for the senior Peru national team in 1985. He made a total of 13 appearances for Peru that year.

Management career
In 2001 Chirinos acted as caretaker manager of Universitario de Deportes after the sacking of Teddy Cardama. There Javier made his Descentralizado debut as a manager coaching the club for four matches in the 2001 season. Chirinos gained more experience in top-flight by acting as the caretaker manager again in 2002 after the resignation of Osvaldo Piazza and once more the following season after the departure of Ricardo Ortiz.

Chirinos returned to act as the caretaker manager for Universitario for six matches in 2010 after Chemo del Solar was at the time unable to meet the requirements to coach in the Descentralizado.

On 7 May 2012 he was announced as the new manager of Cobresol.

Honours

Player
Universitario
Torneo Descentralizado (2): 1985, 1987

Manager
Universitario U20
U-20 Copa Libertadores (1): 2011

References

1960 births
Living people
Footballers from Lima
Peruvian footballers
Peru international footballers
Peruvian Primera División players
Atlético Chalaco footballers
Club Universitario de Deportes footballers
Deportivo Municipal footballers
Sport Boys footballers
1987 Copa América players
Association football midfielders
Peruvian football managers
Peruvian Primera División managers
Club Universitario de Deportes managers